Major League Soccer — the highest professional soccer league in the United States and Canada — has handed out a Defender of the Year award since the league's inception in 1996. The award is decided based on votes from MLS players, MLS coaches and executives and media members.

Winners

References

Defender of the Year